Governor Higgins may refer to:

Frank W. Higgins (1856–1907), 35th Governor of New York
James H. Higgins (1876–1927), 50th Governor of Rhode Island

See also
Ambrosio O'Higgins, 1st Marquess of Osorno (1720–1801), military governor of Chile